Jorge Humberto Rodrigues Cunha (born 21 August 1979), known as Humberto, is a Portuguese footballer who plays as a central defender.

Football career
Born in Vila do Conde, Humberto emerged through local Rio Ave FC's youth system. He made his Primeira Liga debut on 18 January 1999, in a 1–1 home draw against FC Porto where he came on as a late substitute.

From 2001 onwards, Humberto would spend the following seven years with several teams, almost all in the second division. He represented S.C. Braga's reserves, S.C. Covilhã, A.D. Ovarense and C.D. Santa Clara, serving mostly as a backup.

For 2008–09, Humberto returned to the top level with his first club, but failed to appear in any league games during the entire season. Released in the ensuing summer, he returned to division two and signed with U.D. Oliveirense.

External links

National team data 

1979 births
Living people
People from Vila do Conde
Portuguese footballers
Association football defenders
Primeira Liga players
Liga Portugal 2 players
Segunda Divisão players
Rio Ave F.C. players
S.C. Braga B players
S.C. Covilhã players
A.D. Ovarense players
C.D. Santa Clara players
U.D. Oliveirense players
SC Vianense players
Varzim S.C. players
Portugal youth international footballers
Sportspeople from Porto District